Pascal Braud (born 21 November 1968 in Sables d'Olonne, France) is a French former professional footballer who played as a defender. He was twice caretaker manager of Stade Lavallois.

References

External links
Pascal Braud profile at chamoisfc79.fr

1968 births
Living people
French footballers
Association football defenders
Stade Lavallois players
ES Troyes AC players
Chamois Niortais F.C. players
Stade Malherbe Caen players
Dijon FCO players
Ligue 2 players
Stade Briochin players
Stade Lavallois managers
French football managers